In enzymology, a pteridine reductase is an enzyme that catalyzes the chemical reaction

5,6,7,8-tetrahydrobiopterin + 2 NADP+  biopterin + 2 NADPH + 2 H+

Thus, the two substrates of this enzyme are 5,6,7,8-tetrahydrobiopterin and NADP+, whereas its 3 products are biopterin, NADPH, and H+.

This enzyme belongs to the family of oxidoreductases, specifically those acting on the CH-NH group of donors with NAD+ or NADP+ as acceptor.  The systematic name of this enzyme class is 5,6,7,8-tetrahydrobiopterin:NADP+ oxidoreductase. Other names in common use include PTR1, and pteridine reductase 1.

Structural studies

References

 
 
 

EC 1.5.1
NADPH-dependent enzymes
Enzymes of known structure